Tambor is a town in Costa Rica.

Geography
Tambor is located in the portion of the Nicoya Peninsula that is located in the Province of Puntarenas.  Within that province it is located in the cantón of the same name in the district of Cóbano. Tambor is located on the Panica River, which flows from Bahia Ballena.

History
The town started out as a small fishing village but now tourism has greatly superseded that as the primary economic activity.

Tourism

Resorts
Due to the beauty of Bahia Ballena, Tambor has an abundance of resorts and villages nearby it. Some of these are
 Barcelo Tambor
 Los Delphines Gated Community
 Tambor Tropical Beach Resort
 El Arbol De Dios 
 Bahia Tambor

Transport
Tambor Airport, a domestic airport with scheduled service to and from San José is located here.

References

Tambor; nicoyapeninsula.com

Populated places in Puntarenas Province